Kasal, Kasali, Kasalo (Wedding, Worried, Wearied) is a 2006 Filipino romantic comedy film written and directed by Jose Javier Reyes and it was based on a written screenplay by Mary Ann Bautista. It was an official entry for the 2006 Metro Manila Film Festival. It stars the real-life couple, Judy Ann Santos and Ryan Agoncillo as Angie and Jed and also starring Gina Pareño, Gloria Diaz, and Ariel Ureta.

It also emerged as the big winner of the 32nd Metro Manila Film Festival with a total of nine awards.

ABS-CBN's TV Patrol World (now TV Patrol) reported that the total gross of Kasal, Kasali, Kasalo is  making it the 4th highest-grossing Philippine-produced movie of all time (not adjusted for inflation).

Plot
Angie and Jed are opposites of each other. That's why a lot of people were surprised that they fell in love and became a couple. Their happy relationship is put to test when Jed decides to migrate and leave the country for good. His parents have been pestering him to join the whole family in North America and he finally gave in to his parents' will. Just as when he was about to leave, he realized why he should stay. He proposed to Angie and they got engaged.

The wedding preparations became disastrous when their parents started meddling and clashing. Trouble escalates to the point that the wedding was called off. But eventually, they didn’t let their family dispute stop them from getting married. Then again, the newlyweds encountered new sets of highs and lows in their marriage. People and events kept on testing their relationship. The ultimate test happened when Angie got pregnant and her mood swings lead Jed to seek the company of another woman. Will Angie and Jed reconcile again and pass this ultimate test?

Cast

Judy Ann Santos as Angelita "Angie" Mariano-Valeriano
Ryan Agoncillo as Jerome "Jed" Valeriano
Gina Pareño as Belita Mariano
Gloria Diaz as Charito Valeriano
Ariel Ureta as Dr. Carlos Valeriano
Soliman Cruz as Rommell Mariano
Derek Ramsay as Ronnie
Juliana Palermo as Mariel
Lui Villaruz as Erwin
Kat Alano as Sandra
Tuesday Vargas as Catalina
Cheena Crab as Cora
AJ Perez †  Otap
Nina Medina as Manang Pasyang
Gerard Pizzaras as Elmo
Edgar Ebro as the Waiter 
Kakai Bautista as Myra
Carlo Balmaceda as Bronson

Development
In the mid-1990s, Ishmael Bernal and Jose Javier Reyes had talks about developing a romantic comedy movie starring Nora Aunor for Regal Films where it was initially entitled as Kasal. However, the project was canceled due to the death of director Ishmael Bernal in 1996. Years later, Reyes was approached by ABS-CBN to do a film starring Judy Ann Santos and Ryan Agoncillo. Reyes would pitch the film to them and then, it was approved and began writing the script for it. ABS-CBN would later tell Reyes that they had decided to change the title to Kasal, Kasali Kasalo because they did not like the script and the title initially developed by Reyes. Joey Reyes would redevelop the film to include the other two parts which is "Kasali" and "Kasalo".

Reception

Accolades

Sequels

Kasal, Kasali, Kasalo was followed by Sakal, Sakali, Saklolo, released in the following year and revolves Angie and Jed as parents to their son. Like its predecessor, the film was released as one of the entries for Metro Manila Film Festival but it received criticism for the use of ethnic slurs that demean the non-Tagalog-speaking audiences.

In the pre-show for the digital premiere of the film's restored version on KTX.ph on July 15, 2021, when Leo Katigbak (head of ABS-CBN Film Archives and its film restoration project) asked the film's lead stars, Judy Ann Santos and Ryan Agoncillo, and writer-director Jose Javier Reyes if they are interested in having another sequel of the film, their answers are that they are open on doing the third and final part of the film. The writer-director also said that the sequel will happen soon.

References

External links
 

2006 films
Philippine romantic comedy films
Filipino-language films
Star Cinema films
2006 romantic comedy films
Films directed by José Javier Reyes